Semen /ʂemen/ or Xemen /ʃemen/ is a medieval Basque given name of the Vasconic area. It is based on the Basque root seme < senbe 'son' as found in the ancient Aquitanian name Sembetten, attested form "sehi" as 'child', hypothetical ancient root *seni (cf. Koldo Mitxelena and modern form "senide" = 'brother or sister', 'relative'). The explanation by the Biblical name Šim’ōn (Simon) is less convincing. Some think the name may be a corruption of the later part of the Latin name Ma-ximinus, as there are late Classic records that various individuals with this name were becoming very active as officials and residents in upper Hispania near the Pyrenees and Tarraconensis during the last century of the Western Roman Empire, and perhaps into the period of transition from imperial province to independent Kingdom during Visigothic rule.

A "Seguin" was attested in Frankish chronicles when referring to the Count of Bordeaux and Duke of Vasconia (778, 814 and 816). The name is also recorded as Sihiminus, perhaps a rendering of Ximinus.  He may have been a local Basque whose family later fled south over the Pyrenees and helped Enneco Arista take over in Pamplona.

Arab sources in Al-Andalus report in 778 a "Jimeno, the strong", calling him "Mothmin al-Akra". He was a Basque or Hispanic magnate in the upper Ebro territories within the later independent principality of Navarre. This person was possibly related to others near Pamplona in local opposition to both the invading Franks under Charlemagne and the new ruler of the Islamic Iberian realm, Abd al-Rahman I. 

Other than these early medieval examples, it is widely known on both sides of the Pyrenees in the following forms:
Semen or Semeno fem. Semena
Semero fem. Semera
Scemeno (in Villabáscones)
Xemen or Xemeno fem. Xemena
Ximeno or Jimeno fem. Ximena or Jimena (French Chimène)

By adjunction of the patronymic suffixes -ez or -es, it produces the Iberian patronyms:
Portuguese: Ximenes 
Spanish: Ximénez, Giménez, Jiménez

Cyrillic transliteration 
Semen is also a transliteration of the Russian given name  (Semyon, a variant of —Simon) and the Ukrainian given name  (Semen). Notable persons with that name include:
 Semen Altman (born 1946), Ukrainian football coach
 Semen Bogdanov (1894–1960), Soviet Marshal of the Army
 Semen Hulak-Artemovsky (1813–1873), Ukrainian opera composer, singer, actor, and dramatist
 Semen Kirsanov (1906–1972), Ukrainian poet in Russia
 Semen Korsakov (1787–1853 OS), inventor who was involved with an early version of information technology
 Semen L. Frank (1877–1950), religious philosopher
 Semen Paliy (circa 1645–1710), Ukrainian Cossack polkovnyk (colonel)
 Semen Pavlichenko (born 1991), Russian luger
 Semen Semenchenko (born 1974), Ukrainian politician, founder and former commander of Donbas Battalion
 Semen Tymoshenko (1895–1970), Soviet military commander
 Semen Zhavoronkov (1899–1967), Soviet Marshal of the Air Force
 Semen Zhivago (1807–1863), Russian painter

Notes and references 
Basque Onomastics of the Eighth to Sixteenth Centuries

Medieval Basque given names
Masculine given names